Kamran Agayev (also spelled Kamran Aghayev; ; born 9 February 1986) is a retired Azerbaijani football goalkeeper.

During his professional career, Agayev played in national leagues of Azerbaijan, Turkey, Portugal and Czech Republic. He was also a member of Azerbaijan national football team and is the third most-capped player in the history of the team with 79 games. Widely recognized as one of the best goalkeepers in the history of Azerbaijan, he was selected as the Azerbaijani Footballer of the Year in 2008 and goalkeeper of the year in 2009, 2011 and 2012. He announced his retirement from football in January 2022.

Club career

Early career
Agayev began playing football during his school years under his father for local club named Bərəkət. At the young age of just 15, he debuted for Azerbaijani U-17, after he was spotted by one of national coaches. After his impressive performances for youth team, he joined Shafa Baku and won his first big trophy under Vagif Sadygov in 2001.

Professional career
In 2004, he was signed by PFC Turan Tovuz, serving two years in the club, then purchased by Khazar Lankaran. During the 2006–07 season, his performances proved to be instrumental, where club won Azerbaijan Premier League and Azerbaijan Cup. In his first season in the Azerbaijan Premier League, Agayev confirmed his performances, firmly ensuring a place in the starting lineup, his performances being praised by many football pundits. During 6 seasons spent at Khazar Lankaran, Agayev became national champion, two time national league runner-up, three time Azerbaijani Cup winner and CIS Cup champion. He was also the captain of Khazar Lankaran.

On 31 January 2014, Agayev signed an 18-month contract with Gabala FC. A year later, on 1 February 2015, Agayev was released by Gabala. He later played for Kayserispor and Karşıyaka in Turkey and Inter Baku in Azerbaijani championship.

On 12 September 2016, Agayev signed with Primeira Liga side Boavista, until June 2017, making his debut on against Porto on 25 September 2016. His early days at the club were marked by some inconsistency, with both good and bad performances. He took some unfortunate goals, but did manage to pull off a few impressive exhibitions, securing important results for the team. He also quickly bonded with the Boavista fans, often staying in the pitch after the end of the match and taking time to thank the fans for their support.

On 28 July 2017 Agayev signed a one-year contract with Czech First League side Mladá Boleslav. He made his Czech First League debut for Mladá Boleslav against Slavia Prague in Eden Arena on 27 August 2017.

On 17 January 2018, Keşla FK announced the signing of Agayev on a six-month contract.

On 25 August 2020, Agayev signed for Sabail FK on a contract until the end of the 2020–21 season.

On 11 January 2022, Agayev announced his retirement from football.

International career
Agayev has saved ten of the thirteen penalties he faced in matches for Azerbaijan, furthering his reputation as an excellent penalty stopper.

Career statistics

Club

International

Statistics accurate as of match played 17 November 2018

Honours

Club
 Khazar Lankaran
 Azerbaijan Premier League	
 Winner (1): 2006–07	
 Azerbaijan Cup
 Winner (3): 2006–07, 2007–08, 2010–11	
 CIS Cup	
 Winner (1): 2008
	
 Kayserispor
 TFF First League
 Winner (1): 2014–15

 Keşla
 Azerbaijan Cup
 Winner (1): 2017–18

Individual
 Azerbaijani Footballer of the Year (1): 2008.

References

External links 
 
 
 
 

1986 births
Living people
Association football goalkeepers
Azerbaijani footballers
Azerbaijan youth international footballers
Azerbaijan international footballers
Azerbaijani expatriate footballers
Expatriate footballers in Turkey
Azerbaijani expatriate sportspeople in Turkey
Expatriate footballers in Portugal
Azerbaijani expatriate sportspeople in Portugal
Expatriate footballers in the Czech Republic
Turan-Tovuz IK players
Khazar Lankaran FK players
FC Baku players
Gabala FC players
Kayserispor footballers
Karşıyaka S.K. footballers
Shamakhi FK players
Sabail FK players
Boavista F.C. players
FK Mladá Boleslav players
Azerbaijan Premier League players
TFF First League players
Primeira Liga players
Czech First League players
People from Shabran